I Am Evidence is an 2017 American documentary film, directed by Trish Adlesic and Geeta Gandbhir. It focuses on an investigation into thousands upon thousands of rape kits sitting in storage in various police departments being untested. Mariska Hargitay served as a producer on the film.

It had its world premiere at the Tribeca Film Festival on April 24, 2017. It was released on April 16, 2018, by HBO. The film won the 
News & Documentary Emmy Award for Best Documentary.

Synopsis
The film follows an investigation into thousands upon thousands of rape kits sitting in storage in various police departments being untested. Each of those untested kits contain crucial evidence, resulting in unresolved cases. The film also follows women, Helena, Amberly, Ericka, Danielle, who all had their kits untested. Kym Worthy and Mariska Hargitay appear in the film, as they fight for change.

Release
The film had its world premiere at the Tribeca Film Festival on April 24, 2017. It also screened at AFI Docs on June 15, 2017. It was released on April 16, 2018, by HBO.

Reception
I Am Evidence received positive reviews from film critics. It holds a 100% approval rating on review aggregator website Rotten Tomatoes, based on 14 reviews, with a weighted average of 8.20/10. The site's critical consensus reads, "Eye-opening and deeply disturbing, I Am Evidence sifts through an egregious amount of evidence to craft a powerful documentary about survivors and a very broken system."

References

External links
 
 
 

2017 films
2017 documentary films
American documentary films
Documentary films about violence against women
Rape in the United States
HBO documentary films
2010s English-language films
2010s American films